A blurb is a short promotional piece accompanying a piece of creative work. It may be written by the author or publisher or quote praise from others. Blurbs were originally printed on the back or rear dust jacket of a book. With the development of the mass-market paperback, they were placed on both covers by most publishers. Now they also found on web portals and news websites. A blurb may introduce a newspaper or a book.

History

In the US, the history of the blurb is said to begin with Walt Whitman's collection, Leaves of Grass. In response to the publication of the first edition in 1855, Ralph Waldo Emerson had sent Whitman a congratulatory letter, including the phrase "I greet you at the beginning of a great career": the following year, Whitman had these words stamped in gold leaf on the spine of the second edition.

The word blurb was coined in 1907 by American humorist Gelett Burgess (1866–1951). His short 1906 book Are You a Bromide? was presented in a limited edition to an annual trade association dinner. The custom at such events was to have a dust jacket promoting the work and with, as Burgess' publisher B. W. Huebsch described it, "the picture of a damsel—languishing, heroic, or coquettish—anyhow, a damsel on the jacket of every novel".

In this case, the jacket proclaimed "YES, this is a 'BLURB'!" and the picture was of a (fictitious) young woman "Miss Belinda Blurb" shown calling out, described as "in the act of blurbing." The name and term stuck for any publisher's contents on a book's back cover, even after the picture was dropped and only the text remained.

In Germany, the blurb is regarded to have been invented by Karl Robert Langewiesche around 1902. In German bibliographic usage, it is usually located on the second page of the book underneath the half title, or on the dust cover.

Books
A blurb on a book can be any combination of quotes from the work, the author, the publisher, reviews or fans, a summary of the plot, a biography of the author or simply claims about the importance of the work.

In the 1980s, Spy ran a regular feature called "Logrolling in Our Time" which exposed writers who wrote blurbs for one another's books.

Blurb requests

Prominent writers can receive large volumes of blurb requests from aspiring authors.  This has led some writers to turn down such requests as a matter of policy.  For example, Gary Shteyngart announced in The New Yorker that he would no longer write blurbs, except for certain writers with whom he had a professional or personal connection.  Neil Gaiman reports that "Every now and again, I stop doing blurbs.... The hiatus lasts for a year or two, and then I feel guilty or someone asks me at the right time, and I relent." Jacob M. Appel reports that he received fifteen to twenty blurb requests per week and tackles "as many as I can."

Parody blurbs

Many humorous books and films parody blurbs that deliver exaggerated praise by unlikely people and insults disguised as praise.
 Monty Python and the Holy Grail – "Makes Ben Hur look like an Epic"
 1066 and All That – "We look forward keenly to the appearance of their last work"

The Harvard Lampoon satire of The Lord of the Rings, titled Bored of the Rings, deliberately used fake blurbs by deceased authors on the inside cover. One of the blurbs stated "One of the two or three books ...", and nothing else.

Film

Movie blurbs are part of the promotional campaign for films, and usually consist of positive, colorful extracts from published reviews.

Movie blurbs have often been faulted for taking words out of context. The New York Times reported that "the blurbing game is also evolving as newspaper film critics disappear and studios become more comfortable quoting Internet bloggers and movie Web sites in their ads, a practice that still leaves plenty of potential for filmgoers to be bamboozled. Luckily for consumers, there is a cavalry: blurb watchdog sites have sprung up and the number of Web sites that aggregate reviews by established critics is steadily climbing. ... Helping to keep studios in line these days are watchdog sites like eFilmCritic.com and The Blurbs, a Web column for Gelf magazine written by Carl Bialik of The Wall Street Journal."

Slate wrote in an "Explainer" column: "How much latitude do movie studios have in writing blurbs? A fair amount. There's no official check on running a misleading movie blurb, aside from the usual laws against false advertising. Studios do have to submit advertising materials like newspaper ads and trailers to the Motion Picture Association of America for approval. But the MPAA reviews the ads for their tone and content, not for the accuracy of their citations. ... As a courtesy, studios will often run the new, condensed quote by the critic before sending it to print."

Many examples exist of blurb used in marketing a film being traceable directly back to the film's marketing team.

References and sources
References

Sources
 The story of Miss Belinda Blurb at wordorigins.org

 Original dust jacket at the Library of Congress

Bibliography
  
  (Includes bibliography)
 "'Riveting!': The Quandary of the Book Blurb", New York Times, March 6, 2012

External links

 

Book design
Book terminology
Book publishing
Promotion and marketing communications

it:Libro#Quarta di copertina